Hayat Baloch was a BS Physiology student at University of Karachi from Balochistan. He was killed on 13 August 2020 by a serviceman of Frontier Corps (FC), a paramilitary force in Pakistan, in Absor Turbat after a bomb blast.

The accused serviceman was identified to be Shadiullah and was arrested on 20 August 2020. The accused later confessed to his crimes and was awarded death penalty by a local court in Turbat District on 20 January 2021. Hayat's family expressed satisfaction over the verdict issued by the court.

Incident
On August 13, an FC vehicles was targeted by an improvised explosive device at Balochi Bazaar on Absar Road, injuring three FC serviceman. Following the explosion, security personnel launched search operation in the area and during the operation one of the FC serviceman named Shadiullah caught Hayat Baloch and killed him after tying his hands to his back.

Hayat was working in the garden which was close to the site of explosion. So the FC serviceman suspected that Hayat was responsible for the attack on their vehicle.

Following the incident, other FC serviceman in the area overpowered Shadiullah and disarmed him immediately.

Reaction
Federal Minister for Human Rights Shireen Mazari
issued a statement in the national assembly of Pakistan and condemned the incident.

Inspector General of FC South went to the house of the deceased to express grief over the incident.

Response
On 20 August 2020, the FC serviceman responsible for killing Hayat was arrested. The accused FC serviceman later confessed to his crime and was awarded death penalty on 21 January 2021 by a local court in Turbat district.

Hayat's family expressed satisfaction over the verdict. Hayat's uncle, Hakeem Baloch, said that he was quite satisfied with the verdict and that the court has provided them with justice.

References

2020 murders in Pakistan
Human rights abuses in Pakistan
2020 deaths
2020 in Balochistan, Pakistan
Kech District
Deaths by firearm in Pakistan
Deaths by person in Pakistan
Encounters in Pakistan